The 2003 Toronto Grand Prix of Mosport was the fifth race of the 2003 American Le Mans Series season.  It took place at Mosport International Raceway, Ontario on August 17, 2003.

Official results
Class winners in bold.  Cars failing to complete 75% of winner's distance marked as Not Classified (NC).

Statistics
 Pole Position - #16 Dyson Racing - 1:07.906
 Fastest Lap - #16 Dyson Racing - 1:09.479
 Distance - 459.056 km
 Average Speed - 166.189 km/h

References

 Race Results

External links
 2003 Grand Prix of Mosport Race Broadcast (American Le Mans Series YouTube Channel)

Mosport
Grand Prix of Mosport
Grand Prix of Mosport
2003 in Ontario